Phenomena is an album by American group Audiomachine, released on 6 May 2014. The album peaked at #2 on the American Top Classical Albums chart and #47 on Heatseekers Albums chart.

Track listing

Charts

References

External links
 

2014 albums
Audiomachine albums